"Alwayz Into Somethin'" is a song by American hip hop group N.W.A, performed by Dr. Dre and MC Ren featuring Admiral D. It is the lead single from their second studio album, Niggaz4Life. The song also appeared on the N.W.A's Greatest Hits album and The Best of N.W.A: The Strength of Street Knowledge.

History
The song is an early example of G-funk produced by Dr. Dre. His commercially successful solo debut, The Chronic, further developed the subgenre with beats, samples, and instrumentation similar to the one used in "Alwayz into Somethin'. The song was featured in Grand Theft Auto: San Andreas, on the West Coast gangsta rap station, Radio Los Santos.

In a part of the lyrics, Dr. Dre disses Ice Cube in the line, "Dre I was speakin' to your bitch O'Shea", referring to Ice Cube leaving the group over royalty disputes.

Music video
In the music video, N.W.A's members are shown shoplifting, stealing cars, shooting at rival gang members, blowing things up, being arrested and thrown in jail, and generally making a nuisance of themselves. The video depicts scenes of murder and gang violence. The D.O.C. makes a cameo appearance.

Charts

References

External links

1991 singles
1991 songs
G-funk songs
N.W.A songs
Ruthless Records singles
Song recordings produced by Dr. Dre
Songs written by Dr. Dre
Songs written by MC Ren
Songs written by The D.O.C.
Diss tracks